Sonny Alejandro Guadarrama Bermúdez (born March 27, 1987) is an American professional soccer player who plays as a midfielder.

Club career

San Antonio FC 
On February 23, 2018, Guadarrama was signed to San Antonio FC of the United Soccer League.

Austin Bold 
On November 6, it was announced that Guadarrama would join Austin Bold FC ahead of their inaugural season in the USL Championship. Guadarrama left Austin following the 2020 season, but returned to the club on September 15, 2021.

References

External links
 

1987 births
Living people
American soccer players
American expatriate soccer players
American sportspeople of Mexican descent
Soccer players from Austin, Texas
Austin Lightning players
Santos Laguna footballers
Atlético Morelia players
C.F. Mérida footballers
Atlante F.C. footballers
Club Necaxa footballers
Campbell Fighting Camels soccer players
Dorados de Sinaloa footballers
Expatriate footballers in Mexico
Association football midfielders
USL League Two players
United States men's youth international soccer players
United States men's under-20 international soccer players
American expatriate sportspeople in Mexico
San Antonio FC players
Austin Bold FC players
USL Championship players